Mahir Savranlıoğlu (born August 7, 1986) is a Turkish footballer who plays for SGV Freiberg.

External links

1986 births
Living people
Turkish footballers
KFC Uerdingen 05 players
FC Gütersloh 2000 players
FC Schalke 04 II players
Stuttgarter Kickers players
3. Liga players
Association football midfielders
People from Herrenberg
Sportspeople from Stuttgart (region)